Come an' Get It is the fourth studio album by English hard rock band Whitesnake, released in 1981. It was, at the time, Whitesnake's highest-charting release in the UK, hitting No. 2 and being kept off the top spot by Adam and the Ants' Kings of the Wild Frontier.

"Don't Break My Heart Again" and "Would I Lie to You" were released as singles, the former making the UK Top 20.

EMI remastered the CD in 2007, adding six bonus tracks.

Cover art
Come an' Get Its cover art was created by British artist Malcolm Horton. Malcolm had been contacted by an old friend John Ward who was at the time road manager for Whitesnake. He explained that the band didn’t like any of the ideas for the album cover that EMI, their record label had come up with and so he suggested getting Malcolm involved. The band agreed and so he was asked to go and meet them and come up with some ideas. The final artwork sees the white snake trapped inside a glass apple on the front cover and on the reverse the glass apple is shattered and the snake set free. The power of seduction / temptation clearly too strong.

Malcolm describes the time in a blog post celebrating the 40th anniversary of its release. Painting Whitesnake’s Come An’ Get It album cover – 40 years on

The original artwork has since gone missing.

 Track listing 

 Personnel 
Whitesnake
 David Coverdale – vocals
 Micky Moody – guitar, backing vocals
 Bernie Marsden – guitar, backing vocals
 Neil Murray – bass guitar
 Ian Paice – drums
 Jon Lord – keyboards

Production
Martin Birch - producer, engineer, mixing
Malcolm Horton - LP artwork

Charts
 

Album

Singles Don't Break My Heart Again Would I Lie to You'

Certifications

References 

Whitesnake albums
1981 albums
Albums produced by Martin Birch
Liberty Records albums
Polydor Records albums
Hard rock albums by English artists
Blues rock albums by English artists
Mirage Records albums
Atlantic Records albums